Velká Bystřice is a town in Olomouc District in the Olomouc Region of the Czech Republic. It has about 3,500 inhabitants.

History
The first written mention of Velká Bystřice is from 1275. In around 1500 the village was promoted to a town.

Notable people
František Moravec (born 1939), parasitologist

References

Populated places in Olomouc District
Cities and towns in the Czech Republic